Hans Müller(-Einigen) (born 25 October 1882 in Brünn, Austria-Hungary; died 8 March 1950 in Einigen) was a German language writer, author of screenplays and director. As his proper name, Hans Müller, was quite common, he added the name of the Swiss village of Einigen to it.

He is known for The White Horse Inn (Im weißen Rößl, 1930), written together with Robert Gilbert and Erik Charell, set to music by Ralph Benatzky. Earlier, he collaborated frequently with composer Erich Wolfgang Korngold, writing the librettos for Violanta (1916) and Das Wunder der Heliane (1927), and having Korngold score the incidental music to his Der Vampir oder Die Gejagten (1923).

Müller-Einigen went to Hollywood in the 1920s where several films were made from his scripts. Since 1930 he lived in Einigen.

His brother was the author and critic Ernst Lothar (real name: Ernst Lothar Müller).

Hans Müller was attacked in Karl Kraus' play The Last Days of Mankind and in his journal Die Fackel (de) (The Torch).

Works
Novels
Buch der Abenteuer, 1905 – including Nux, der Prinzgemahl, made into the operetta Ein Walzertraum (1907) and the film The Smiling Lieutenant (1931)

Poetry
Die lockende Geige, 1904
Der Garten des Lebens, 1904
Die Rosenlaute, 1909

Dramas
Das Wunder des Beatus, 1910
Die Sterne, 1919 – made into the Ernst Lubitsch 1923 silent film Die Flamme
Der Vampir oder die Gejagten, 1923, with incidental music provided by Erich Korngold.
Der Helfer Gottes, 1947

Libretti
Violanta, opera, 1916; music: Erich Wolfgang Korngold
Das Wunder der Heliane, opera, 1927; music: Erich Wolfgang Korngold

Screen plays
Die Tochter der Frau von Larsac, 1925 (silent movie)
Schwester Veronica, 1927 (silent)
The Burning Heart, 1929 (silent)
Monte Carlo, 1930
Darling of the Gods, 1930
 Bombs on Monte Carlo, 1931; music: Werner R. Heymann
Yorck, 1931
Quick, 1932
Waltz War, 1933
Fresh Wind from Canada, 1935

Autobiography
Geliebte Erde, 1938
Jugend in Wien, 1945

References

External links 
 
 
 Biografie (cyranos.ch)

1882 births
1950 deaths
Writers from Brno
People from the Margraviate of Moravia
Austrian Jews
Austrian male dramatists and playwrights
Austrian opera librettists
Austrian theatre directors
Austrian theatre managers and producers
20th-century Austrian dramatists and playwrights
20th-century male writers
Austrian expatriates in the United States
Austrian emigrants to Switzerland